Philautus garo is a species of frog in the family Rhacophoridae.
It is endemic to India, and has been recorded in the Garo Hills of Assam and Meghalaya, and in Dzulake in Nagaland.

Its natural habitat is subtropical or tropical moist lowland forests.
It is threatened by habitat loss.

References

Endemic fauna of India
Frogs of India
garo
Amphibians described in 1919
Taxonomy articles created by Polbot